My Name Is Not Easy is a novel by Debby Dahl Edwardson published by Marshall Cavendish in 2011.  It tells the story of three Iñupiaq children who are sent from their home in the Arctic Circle to a Catholic boarding school attended by both native and white children.

The book was a 2011 National Book Award Finalist in the Young People's Literature category.

References

2011 American novels
Inupiat
Marshall Cavendish books